James D. Tucker (December 11, 1932 – May 14, 2020) was an American professional basketball player.

Biography 
Tucker attended Paris Western High School in Paris, Kentucky. A 6' 7" forward from Duquesne University, Tucker played three seasons (1954–1957) in the National Basketball Association (NBA) as a member of the Syracuse Nationals. He averaged 4.1 points per game in his career and won a league championship in 1955.

Tucker and teammate Earl Lloyd were also the first two African Americans to play on an NBA championship team.

In 2018, a short documentary titled "Let 'Em Know You're There" told the story of Jim's professional basketball career and eventual battle with Alzheimer's disease. The documentary won a 2019 Mid-Atlantic Emmy.

Tucker died on May 14, 2020 from complications from Alzheimer’s disease at age 87.

References

External links

1932 births
2020 deaths
All-American college men's basketball players
American men's basketball players
Basketball players from Kentucky
Duquesne Dukes men's basketball players
People from Paris, Kentucky
Power forwards (basketball)
Syracuse Nationals draft picks
Syracuse Nationals players